Fast Forward Eats the Tape is the fourth studio album by Canadian skate punk band Belvedere. Besides  'Twas Hell Said Former Child, it was their most successful recording and became an influential album for the genre. The album contains one re-recorded song from their previous album,  'Twas Hell Said Former Child and one re-recorded song from their split release with fellow Canadian band Downway. The pieces are Two Minutes for Looking So Good and Brandy Wine respectively.

 "Subhuman Nature" – 2:18
 "Three's a Crowd" – 2:46
 "Closed Doors" (Steve Rawles) – 3:20
 "Unplugged" – 2:27
 "Quicksand" – 2:30
 "Two Minutes for Looking So Good" (Rawles) – 2:43
 "All About Perspectives" – 3:02
 "Elementally Regarded" – 1:21
 "Brandy Wine" (Sinclair, Rawles) – 2:52
 "Stain" – 3:16
 "Slaves to the Pavement" – 2:59
 "Early Retirement" (Rawles) – 1:24
 "Popular Inquiries Into Everyday Disasters" – 3:12
 "Bad Decisions" – 2:30
 "Anesthetic" – 4:08

Personnel
Steve Rawles – vocals, rhythm guitar
Scott Marshall – lead guitar
Jason Sinclair – bass
Graham Churchill – drums

References

2004 albums
Belvedere (band) albums